Macroprotodon is a genus of snakes in the family Colubridae. All of the member species of the genus are commonly known as false smooth snakes.

Taxonomy
The genus Macroprotodon was originally described by French zoologist Alphone Guichenot in 1850. The genus is in the subfamily Colubrinae of the family Colubridae.

Species
Macroprotodon contains four species.
M. abubakeri 
M. brevis  – western false smooth snake
M. cucullatus  – false smooth snake
M. mauritanicus 

Some authorities have considered some of these species to be subspecies of the other species.

Nota bene: A binomial authority in parentheses indicates that the species was originally described in a genus other than Macroprotodon.

References

Further reading
Boulenger GA (1896). Catalogue of the Snakes in the British Museum (Natural History). Volume III., Containing the Colubridæ (Opisthoglyphæ and Proteroglyphæ) ... London: Trustees of the British Museum (Natural History). (Taylor and Francis, printers). xiv + 727 pp. + Plates I-XXV. (Macroprotodon, p. 175).
Guichenot A (1850). Histoire naturelle des reptiles et des poissons de l'Algérie. Exploration scientifique de l'Algérie pendant les années 1840, 1841, 1842. Paris: Imprimerie Nationale. 147 pp. + atlas. (Macroprotodon, new genus, and M. mauritanicus, new species, p. 22). (in French).

 
Colubrids
Snake genera
Taxa named by Alphonse Guichenot
Taxonomy articles created by Polbot